Luís Seda (born 5 June 1976) is a Puerto Rican boxer. He competed in the men's featherweight event at the 1996 Summer Olympics.

References

1976 births
Living people
Puerto Rican male boxers
Olympic boxers of Puerto Rico
Boxers at the 1996 Summer Olympics
Place of birth missing (living people)
Featherweight boxers